
Gmina Bogoria is a rural gmina (administrative district) in Staszów County, Świętokrzyskie Voivodeship, in south-central Poland. From 1975–1998 it was part of the former Tarnobrzeg Voivodeship.

Demography 
According to the 2011 Poland census, there were 7,983 people residing in Bogoria Commune, of whom 50% were male and 50% were female. In the commune, the population was spread out, with 21.9% under the age of 18, 38.3% from 18 to 44, 21.9% from 45 to 64, and 17.8% who were 65 years of age or older.
 Figure 1. Population pyramid of commune in 2010 — by age group and sex

Villages
Gmina Bogoria contains the villages and settlements of Bogoria, Budy, Ceber, Domaradzice, Gorzków, Grzybów, Józefów Witowicki, Jurkowice, Kiełczyna, Kolonia Bogoria, Kolonia Pęcławice, Kolonia Pęcławska, Kolonia Wysoki Małe, Łagówka, Mała Wieś, Malkowice, Miłoszowice, Moszyny, Niedźwiedź, Pęcławice Górne, Pełczyce, Podlesie, Przyborowice, Rosołówka, Szczeglice, Ujazdek, Wagnerówka, Wierzbka, Witowice, Wola Kiełczyńska, Wola Malkowska, Wolica, Wysoki Duże, Wysoki Małe, Wysoki Średnie, Zagorzyce and Zimnowoda.

Neighbouring gminas
Gmina Bogoria is bordered by the gminas of Iwaniska, Klimontów, Raków and Staszów.

References

External links
Polish official population figures 2006

Bogoria
Staszów County